Eugoa pectinicrassa is a moth of the family Erebidae first described by Jeremy Daniel Holloway in 2001. It is found on Borneo. The habitat consists of lowland forests.

The length of the forewings is 7 mm. Adults are dark brown.

References

Moths described in 2001
pectinicrassa